William Earl White (August 26, 1939 – May 21, 2017) was a Canadian professional ice hockey player and coach. White was one of the most notable defensive defencemen of the 1970s.

Playing career
After playing his junior hockey for the Toronto Marlboros of the Ontario Hockey Association, White turned professional in 1960. Held back due to the paucity of jobs available in the Original Six days of the National Hockey League, he would star for seven seasons in the minor league American Hockey League, mostly for the Springfield Indians. While with the Indians, White was instrumental in the players' strikes which led to the prominence of agent Alan Eagleson and the creation of the National Hockey League Players' Association.

The Los Angeles Kings of the NHL acquired the rights to White in the 1967 NHL expansion, and White was the Kings' best defenceman, leading the team in scoring both full years he played for them. During the 1970 season, White was traded to the powerful Chicago Black Hawks, for whom he would play the remainder of his career. Paired with rushing defenceman Pat Stapleton, they formed one of the greatest defensive pairings of the decade, and despite recurring minor injuries, White averaged nearly 30 assists a season in his five full seasons with Chicago. During that time, he was named to the NHL's Second All-Star squad on defence in 1972, 1973 and 1974, as well as being named to play in the All-Star Game for six consecutive seasons between 1969 and 1974. He was also a member of the Canadian team in the 1972 Summit Series against the Soviet Union, playing eight games.

Already missing significant time in the previous seasons due to injuries, White suffered a neck injury in the 1976 playoffs from which he sustained lingering nerve damage, and retired in consequence.

White finished his NHL career with 50 goals, 215 assists and 265 points in 604 games, with 495 penalty minutes. At the time of his retirement, even though he had played only six full seasons with the Hawks, he was in the top five of all-time Black Hawk defence scorers.

Team Canada 1972 member

White was chosen to be part of Team Canada '72 that battled the Soviet Union's National Team in a famous eight-game series in September 1972.  White scored a goal for Canada in the decisive final game in Moscow.  He also finished the series with a plus/minus of +7--the best mark of any Canadian player.

Retirement and death
White replaced long-time Black Hawks coach Billy Reay as interim coach midway through the 1977 season, but failed to improve the team's fortunes and left after that season. He later went on to coach his old junior team, the Toronto Marlboros.

White died on May 21, 2017, at the age of 77.

Career statistics

Regular season and playoffs

International

Coaching record

References

External links
 

1939 births
2017 deaths
Canadian ice hockey coaches
Canadian ice hockey defencemen
Chicago Blackhawks coaches
Chicago Blackhawks players
Los Angeles Kings players
Oshawa Generals coaches
Rochester Americans players
Ice hockey people from Toronto
Springfield Indians players
Toronto Marlboros coaches
Toronto Marlboros players